

The Cathedral Hill Historic District is an area in Baltimore, Maryland. It lies in the northern part of Downtown just south of Mount Vernon. Roughly bounded by Saratoga Street, Park Avenue, Hamilton Street, and St. Paul Street, these 10 or so blocks contain some of the most significant buildings in Baltimore. The area takes its name from the Basilica of the Assumption which sits in the heart of the district. Despite the number of large religious structures in the area, the district's buildings are primarily commercial in character, with a broad collection of significant commercial structures ranging in date from 1790 to 1940.

Cathedral Hill contains a mix of architectural styles from Georgian of St. Paul's Rectory to Art Deco along Charles Street. The area was added to the National Register of Historic Places in 1987. Cathedral Hill is within Baltimore National Heritage Area.

Notable buildings
 Basilica of the Assumption
 First Unitarian Church
 Franklin Street Presbyterian Church
 Old St. Paul's Episcopal Church
 St. Paul's Rectory

Images

References

External links
 at the Maryland Historiucal Trust
Boundary Map of the district at the Maryland Historical Trust
CHAP listing for Cathedral Hill
National Park Service Baltimore Travel Itinerary - Cathedral Hill Historic District

Historic districts on the National Register of Historic Places in Baltimore
Baltimore National Heritage Area
Historic American Buildings Survey in Baltimore
Churches on the National Register of Historic Places in Maryland